Ådalsbruk Station was a train station on the Røros Line in Norway from 1862 to 1972.

It was opened in 1862 as Løken, renamed Aadalsbrug in 1881 to correspond with the nearby village. Both were named after the iron works Aadals Brug Jernstøberi og Mek. Værksted. The spelling was modernized to Ådalsbruk in 1921.

From 1972 the station was no longer staffed.

References

Railway stations on the Røros Line
Railway stations in Hedmark
Railway stations opened in 1862
1862 establishments in Norway
Railway stations closed in 1972
1972 disestablishments in Norway
Disused railway stations in Norway
Løten